The Yan'an faction were a group of pro-China communists in the North Korean government after the division of Korea following World War II.

The group was involved in a power struggle with pro-Soviet factions but Kim Il-sung was eventually able to defeat both factions and dominate the North Korean government, allowing him to push for unification during the Korean War. "Yeonan" is the Korean reading of Yan'an, a town in China that formed the base of the Chinese Communist Party during the Chinese Civil War.

Led first by Mu Chong and then by Kim Tu-bong and Choe Chang-ik, the Korean exiles  had lived in China's Shaanxi province and joined the Chinese Communist Party whose regional headquarters were at Yan'an.

They had formed their own party, in exile, the "North-Chinese League for the Independence of Korea". In the autumn of 1945, the Soviet Union allowed some 4,000 Koreans who had joined the Chinese communist movement to fight with the People's Liberation Army to return to North Korea, though they disarmed them. They then formed the New People's Party, which merged with the Communist Party in 1946 to form the Workers Party of North Korea. Many members of the Yan'an faction had fought in the Chinese Eighth Route Army and New Fourth Army and thus had close relations with Mao Zedong.

Influence
The group included thirty Korean People's Army (KPA) generals by the time the Korean War started. Mu Chong was vice marshal at the Ministry of Defence, Pak Il-u was minister of internal affairs, and deputy commander North Korea-China Combined Forces Command. Kim Ung was KPA front commander in 1951, Pang Ho-san, Lee Kwon-mu and Kim Chang-dok were corps commanders.

List
 Kim Tu-bong
 Choe Chang-ik
 Mu Chong
 Ho Jong-suk
 Pak Il-u
 Han Pin
 Yun Kong-hum
 So Hwi
 Kim Chang-man
 Kim Won-bong

References

Citations

Sources

 Bragg, Christine: Korea, Vietnam and US Foreign Policy 1945-75, Heinemann, 2005 
 Noack, David: Das Wendejahr (The turn-around year), junge Welt, 3 December 2011 

History of the Workers' Party of Korea
Organizations associated with the Chinese Communist Party
Political history of North Korea
China–North Korea relations